Discotheque play like "A" Rainbows -enter&exit- is a live tour DVD by visual kei rock band Alice Nine.  It was filmed on their DISCOTHEQUE play like "A" RAINBOWS tour and released on October 29, 2008.

Track list
Bonus. Shunkashuutou

Credits 
Alice Nine
Nao – drums
Tora – guitar
Hiroto – lead guitar
Saga – bass, backing vocals
Shou – vocals

External links 
 Official website 
 Official website at King Records
 Official MySpace

References 

Alice Nine video albums
2008 live albums
2008 video albums
Live video albums